Cave-In! (sometimes listed as Cave In!) is a 1983 American made-for-television action disaster film starring Dennis Cole, Leslie Nielsen and James Olson.  The movie was produced by Irwin Allen in 1979 in association with Warner Bros. Television for NBC but did not air until 1983.

Plot
A park ranger must lead a US senator, a disgraced cop, his wife, a manipulative professor and his daughter across five miles of dangerous terrain to escape an unstable cavern, unaware that the seventh member of the group is an armed and violent escaped convict.

Cast
Dennis Cole as Gene Pearson
Susan Sullivan as Senator Kate Lassiter
Leslie Nielsen as Joe Johnson
Ray Milland as Professor Harrison Soames
James Olson as Tom Arlen
Julie Sommars as Liz Johnson
Sheila Larken as Ann Soames
Lonny Chapman as Walt Charles

References

External links

1983 television films
1983 films
1983 action films
1980s disaster films
American action television films
American disaster films
Disaster television films
Films produced by Irwin Allen
NBC network original films
1980s English-language films
Films directed by Georg Fenady
Films scored by Richard LaSalle
1980s American films